Hartree is the unit of energy in the Hartree atomic units system.

Hartree may also refer to:
 Appleton–Hartree equation, a mathematical expression that describes the refractive index for electromagnetic wave propagation in a cold magnetized plasma, named in part after Douglas Hartee
 Cape Hartree, a cape in the South Orkney Islands
 Hartree atomic units, a system of natural units of measurement, named after Douglas Hartree
 Hartree Centre, a computing research facility, named after Douglas Hartree
 Hartree equation, an equation for atoms, named after Douglas Hartree
 Hartree–Fock method, a method of approximation for the determination of the wave function and the energy of a quantum many-body system in a stationary state, named in part after Douglas Hartree
 Post-Hartree–Fock, the set of methods developed to improve on the Hartree–Fock method
 Restricted open-shell Hartree–Fock, a variant of Hartree–Fock method for open shell molecules
 Unrestricted Hartree–Fock, the most common molecular orbital method for open shell molecules

Hartree is a surname and may also refer to:
 John Dickson, Lord Hartree (1600–1653), Scottish judge and politician
 Douglas Hartree (1897–1958), English mathematician and physicist, son of Eva Hartree
 Eva Hartree (1873–1947), first woman to be Mayor of Cambridge, mother of Douglas Hartree
 George Hartree (1914–1988), English actor and musician known professionally as Charles Hawtrey (actor, born 1914)
 John Hartree (born 1948), Australian rules footballer